Skuru IK Handboll is a women's handball team based in Nacka, Sweden, that competes in the SHE Women. They play their home matches in Nacka Bollhall, which have capacity for 460 spectators. They play in green shirts and green shorts.

Kits

Honours
SHE Women:
Gold: 2001, 2004, 2005, 2021
Silver: 2013, 2014, 2015, 2016, 2019, 2022

Swedish Cup:
Gold: 2022

Arena 
Arena: Nacka Bollhall
City: Nacka 
Capacity: 460
Address: Griffelvägen 11, 131 40 Nacka

Team

Current squad
Squad for the 2021–22 season

Goalkeepers 
 16  Linnéa Björkman
 21  Ellen Dahlström
 24  Josephine Nordstrøm
Wingers 
LW
 3  Sofia Karlsson
 7  Elin Hansson
 15  Jennifer Johansson
RW
 10  Clara Bergsten
 23  Malin Berndal
Line players
 13  Wilma Schelin
 14  Vilma Matthijs Holmberg

Back players
LB
 6  Ellen Voutilainen
 11  Cornelia Dahlström
 25  Alva Persson
CB
 17  Elin Åkesson
 19  Daniela de Jong
 22  Kaja Stojilkovic
RB
 4  Alexandra Bjärrenholt
 28  Felicia Robertsson

Technical staff
  Head Coach: Magnus Oscarsson Söder
  Assistant coach: Calle Tagesson
  Goalkeeping coach: Thomas Forsberg
  Team Leader: Tatti Henryson
  Team Leader: Johan Östlund
  Team Leader: Mats Niklasson

Transfers
Transfers for the 2023-24 season

Joining
  Rebecca Nilsson (GK) (from  TuS Metzingen)

Leaving
  Josephine Nordstrøm Olsen (GK) (to  Byåsen HE)

External links
  

Swedish handball clubs
Nacka Municipality